Lygniodes hypoleuca is a moth of the family Erebidae. It is found in Taiwan.

References

External links
Species info

Moths described in 1852
Lygniodes
Moths of Taiwan